Allison Janney is an American actress who has received numerous nominations and has won multiple awards, including an Academy Award, a BAFTA Award, a Golden Globe Award, six Critics' Choice Awards, seven Screen Actors Guild Awards, seven Primetime Emmy Awards, two  Drama Desk Awards and two nominations for the Tony Award.

After numerous years of minor supporting roles in films and television, Janney's breakthrough came with her portrayal of C. J. Cregg on the NBC political drama The West Wing, which earned her four Primetime Emmy Awards, four Screen Actors Guild Awards, and four nominations for the Golden Globe Award. She earned further Emmy wins for her performances on television series Masters of Sex and Mom, bringing her cumulative wins to seven. By virtue of this, she is the second most awarded thespian in the history of Emmy Awards (along with Ed Asner).

For her work on Broadway, Janney has received two Drama Desk Awards, three Outer Critics Circle Awards, the Clarence Derwent Award, the Theatre World Award, four nominations for the Drama League Award and two nominations for the Tony Award.

Janney has starred in various acclaimed films including American Beauty (1999), The Hours (2002), Hairspray (2007), Juno (2007), The Help (2011) and Bombshell (2019). All these films earned her nominations at the Screen Actors Guild Awards and Critics' Choice Movie Awards for Best Ensemble, winning for the first and the penultimate films. For her portrayal of LaVona Golden in the 2017 biographical film I, Tonya, Janney won the Academy Award, BAFTA Award, Critics' Choice Movie Award, Golden Globe Award, Independent Spirit Award, and the  Screen Actors Guild Award for Best Supporting Actress.

Major associations

Academy Awards

British Academy Film Awards

Primetime Emmy Awards

Golden Globe Awards

Screen Actors Guild Awards

Tony Awards

Critics awards

Alliance of Women Film Journalists

African American Film Critics Association

Austin Film Critics Association

Black Film Critics Circle

Boston Society of Film Critics

Central Ohio Film Critics Society Awards

Chicago Film Critics Association Awards

Chicago Indie Critics Awards

Chlotrudis Society for Independent Film Awards

Columbus Film Critics Association Awards

Critics' Choice Awards

Dallas–Fort Worth Film Critics Association Awards

Denver Film Critics Society Awards

Detroit Film Critics Society Awards

Florida Film Critics Circle Awards

Georgia Film Critics Association Awards

Hawaii Film Critics Society Awards

Houston Film Critics Society Awards

Indiana Film Journalists Association Awards

IndieWire Critics Poll Awards

Las Vegas Film Critics Society Awards

London Film Critics Circle Awards

Los Angeles Online Film Critics Society Awards

Memphis Online Film Critics Awards

National Society of Film Critics Awards

Nevada Film Critics Society Awards

New York Film Critics Online Awards

North Carolina Film Critics Association Awards

North Texas Film Critics Association Awards

Oklahoma Film Critics Circle Awards

Online Film Critics Society Awards

Online Film & Television Association Awards

Outer Critics Circle Awards

Philadelphia Film Critics Circle Awards

Phoenix Critics Circle Awards

Phoenix Film Critics Society Awards

San Diego Film Critics Society Awards

San Francisco Film Critics Circle Awards

Seattle Film Critics Society Awards

Southeastern Film Critics Association Awards

St. Louis Film Critics Association Awards

Television Critics Association Awards

Toronto Film Critics Association Awards

Utah Film Critics Association Awards

Vancouver Film Critics Circle Awards

Village Voice Film Poll

Washington D.C. Area Film Critics Association Awards

Wisconsin Film Critics Circle Awards

Women Film Critics Circle Awards

Other awards

Australian Academy of Cinema and Television Arts Awards

American Associations of Retired Persons Movies for Grownups Awards

American Comedy Awards

American Film Institute

Awards Circuit Community Awards

Behind the Voice Actors Awards

CinEuphoria Awards

Clarence Derwent Awards

Dorian Awards

Drama Desk Awards

Drama League Awards

Gold Derby Awards

Golden Schmoes Awards

Gotham Independent Film Awards

Gracie Allen Awards

Hollywood Film Awards

Independent Spirit Awards

Ovation Awards

Mar del Plata Film Festival

Monte-Carlo TV Festival

National Board of Review

Palm Springs International Film Festival

People's Choice Awards

Prism Awards

Santa Barbara International Film Festival

Satellite Awards

TV Guide Awards

Theatre World Awards

Viewers for Quality Television Awards

Notes

References

External links
 
 

Janney, Allison